Kumara Kassapa or Kumara Kathapa was the Mongol-installed King of Pagan, who reigned for ten weeks in 1301. The second son of King Kyawswa of Pagan sought Mongol intervention after his father was overthrown by the Myinsaing brothers in 1297. Declared the rightful king of Burma by Emperor Temür Khan in 1300, Kumara Kassapa returned to Pagan (Bagan) with a Mongol invasion force in 1301, only to retreat after the Mongol general staff accepted a bribe.

Background
Kumara Kassapa was born to Princess Saw of Thitmahti and Prince Kyawswa, Viceroy of Dala (modern Twante), during the last days of the Pagan Empire. According to contemporary inscriptions, he had one full elder brother Theingapati. He grew up in the south but in 1289, two years after the fall of the Pagan Empire, he moved to the capital Pagan (Bagan). His father had been handpicked by the dowager queen Pwa Saw to succeed his grandfather King Narathihapate, who was assassinated two years earlier.

At Pagan, his father presided over a greatly shrunken kingdom; his control barely extended outside the capital. In the following years, his authority was increasingly challenged by the three brothers of Myinsaing who led the defense of the Irrawaddy valley against the Mongol invaders in 1283–87. Kyawswa sought Mongol vassalage with the hope of getting their protection, and officially became a Mongol vassal on 20 March 1297. Kyawswa was subsequently removed from power nine months later by the Myinsaing brothers. About a year and a half later, on 10 May 1299, the Myinsaing brothers executed Kyawswa and Theingapati.

Mongol vassal king
Kumara Kassapa somehow escaped the execution. He managed to travel to Yunnan, reaching there in September 1299. The Mongol provincial government, which did not have enough spare troops, initially ignored his pleas to intervene. They changed their mind only after the Myinsaing brothers seized two southernmost Mongol garrisons in northern Burma in January 1300. They finally sent him to Beijing where on 22 June 1300 the prince was declared the rightful king of Burma by Emperor Temür Khan. In the following dry season, the vassal king accompanied a 12,000-strong invasion force. He entered Pagan without difficulty as the main invasion army reached nearby Myinsaing on 25 January 1301. (His half-brother Saw Hnit, the Myinsaing-installed King of Pagan, had evacuated the city, and was in Myinsaing.)

Kumara Kassapa's reign was short-lived. A month into the siege, the Mongols launched a major assault on Myinsaing on 28 February 1301. But Myinsaing defenses held, and by 12 March 1301, ceasefire negotiations began. The two sides came to an agreement that called for a Mongol withdrawal in exchange for a bribe of 800 taels (30 kg) of gold and 2200 taels (83 kg) of silver. Kumara Kassapa returned with the Mongol withdrawal that lasted from 6–8 April 1301.

It was the last known event involving the prince. The Mongols did not have much use with him afterwards as they pursued a policy of retrenchment from the peripheral regions. As such, they sent no more expeditions although they were unhappy with the withdrawal. The Mongols completely evacuated northern Burma two years later on 4 April 1303. He certainly was not well regarded by the Myinsaing brothers. A stone inscription, inscribed a year after the war in 1302, calls him Taruk Pyi La Thaw Tet-Taw-Mu Mingyi ("The King who Came from the Land of the Taruk [China]").

Notes

References

Bibliography
 
 
 
 
 
 
 

Pagan dynasty
14th-century Burmese monarchs
13th-century Burmese people